Baader is a 2002 German film directed by Christopher Roth. It is a biopic about revolutionary Andreas Baader of the notorious Red Army Faction ("the Baader-Meinhof Gang") which operated mainly in West Germany during the 1970s. 

The leading roles are played by Frank Giering (Andreas Baader) and Laura Tonke (Gudrun Ennslin). Birge Schade portrays Ulrike Meinhof.

Though the script is inspired by real-life persons and events, the storyline of the film continuously mixes fact and fiction.

Soundtrack 
The soundtrack was released in 2002 on Normal Records with bands like Can, Suicide, Stone Roses, Trans Am and Campag Velocet.

Quotes

Awards 
2002: Silver Bear Jury Prize of Berlin International Film Festival in the category Neue Perspektiven der Filmkunst (English New perspectives of cinematography), Christopher Roth

See also
 Der Baader Meinhof Komplex
 If Not Us, Who?
 Stammheim – Die Baader-Meinhof-Gruppe vor Gericht

References

Time Out Film Guide 2009

External links

2002 films
2002 thriller drama films
2002 biographical drama films
German thriller drama films
German biographical drama films
2000s German-language films
Biographical films about people convicted on terrorism charges
Thriller films based on actual events
Films set in the 1970s
Films set in West Germany
Films shot in Germany
Cultural depictions of the Red Army Faction
2000s German films